Henry Lloyd Finch was a Democratic member of the Mississippi legislature in the early-to-mid 20th century.

Biography 
Henry Lloyd Finch was born on March 10, 1883, in Polkville, Mississippi. He was the son of Christopher Finch and Mary Elizabeth (Evans) Finch. Finch was educated in the Mississippi Conference Training School. For four years, he taught in the public schools of Jasper County, Mississippi. He graduated from the Law Department of Millsaps College in 1907 with a L. L. B. degree. He began practicing law the same year in Paulding, Mississippi. He moved to Heidelberg, Mississippi, in 1912 and continued practicing law there. In December 1915, he was elected to represent Jasper County as a Democrat in the Mississippi House of Representatives from 1916 to 1920. He was re-elected to serve from 1920 to 1924. He then represented Mississippi's 2nd senatorial district in the Mississippi State Senate from 1944 to 1948.

References 

1883 births
Year of death missing
Democratic Party members of the Mississippi House of Representatives
Democratic Party Mississippi state senators
People from Laurel, Mississippi
Mississippi lawyers